Manassero is an Italian surname. Notable people with the surname include:

 Francesco Manassero (born 1964), Peruvian footballer
 Matteo Manassero (born 1993), Italian golfer
 Patrizia Manassero (born 1960), Italian politician

Italian-language surnames